Tamil Nadu State Highway 62 (SH-62) is a State Highway maintained by the Highways Department of Government of Tamil Nadu. It connects Trichy with Thuraiyur in the northern part of Tamil Nadu.

Route
The route is from TrichyThuraiyur.

See also 
 Highways of Tamil Nadu

References 

State highways in Tamil Nadu
Road transport in Tiruchirappalli